The city of Ottawa, Canada held municipal elections on December 5, 1938.

Mayor of Ottawa

Plebiscites 
(only property owners could vote)

Ottawa Board of Control
(4 elected)

Ottawa City Council
(2 elected from each ward)

References
Ottawa Citizen, December 6, 1938

Municipal elections in Ottawa
1938 elections in Canada
1930s in Ottawa
1938 in Ontario
December 1938 events